System Flaw (known as System Flaw Recruit as a DSiWare title) is an action shooter video game developed by American studio Storm City Games and released exclusively for the Nintendo DSi on October 27, 2009 in the United States and for DSiWare in North America on April 26, 2010 and Europe on April 16, 2010. This is the first Nintendo DSi-exclusive game. The game turns a player's surroundings into the playing environment using the rear facing camera. The objective is to rotate the console around and defeat enemies known as flaws.

References

2009 video games
Nintendo DSi games
DSiWare games
Nintendo DS-only games
Nintendo DS games
Multiplayer and single-player video games
Shooter video games
Video games developed in the United States